Goddamned Asura is a 2021 Taiwanese crime drama film directed by Lou Yi-an and written by Lou Yi-an and Singing Chen. It was inspired by real life events from newspaper reports on random killings. The film is selected as the Taiwanese entry for the Best International Feature Film at the 95th Academy Awards. In November 2021, the film premiered at Taipei's Golden Horse film Festival where it was nominated for Best New Performer (Pan), Best Original Screenplay and won the Best Supporting Actress Award (Wang). 

In July 2022, Goddammed Asura participated in Taipei Film Festival, among the nine nominations it won Best Screenplay, Best Supporting Actress (Wang) and Best Soundtrack (for Qin Xuzhang, Xu Jiawei, Chan Liu and Cai Jiaying). The film also participated the Judicial Film Festival in November 2021, Singapore Chinese Film Festival in December 2021, Taiwan Film Festival in Australia in July 2022, Vancouver Taiwanese Film Festival and the Hong Kong Film Festival in August 2022. It will also participate the Paris Filmosa Festival in September 2022.

Awards and Nominations

Reception 
On 17 March 2022, the reporter Han Chen wrote in the Taipei Times magazine: "The acting is solid across the board, and production value high..."

On 26 July 2022, the magazine Fletcher & Third wrote in a multi page review: "A rich, complex and emotive study of Taipei’s disillusioned youth, Goddamned Asura can occasionally touch on the bleak, offering a dispassionate outlook on contemporary youth culture. But it’s also oddly enchanting; an intriguing work of cinema thats both captivating and ambitious in its execution, and ultimately deserving of attention."

See also 
 List of submissions to the 95th Academy Awards for Best International Feature Film
 List of Taiwanese submissions for the Academy Award for Best International Feature Film

References

External links
 

2021 films
2021 crime thriller films
2021 drama films
2021 horror films
2021 horror thriller films
Taiwanese crime drama films
Taiwanese crime thriller films
Taiwanese drama films
Taiwanese horror films
Taiwanese supernatural horror films
2020s Mandarin-language films
2020s supernatural horror films
Films set in Taiwan
Films shot in Taiwan